Orleans County is a county in the western part of the U.S. state of New York. As of the 2020 census, the population was 40,343. The county seat is Albion.  The county received its name at the insistence of Nehemiah Ingersoll though historians are unsure how the name was selected. The two competing theories are that it was named to honor the French Royal House of Orleans or that it was to honor Andrew Jackson's victory in New Orleans.

Located on the south shore of Lake Ontario, Orleans County since the late 20th century has been considered part of the Rochester, NY Metropolitan Statistical Area.

History
When counties were established by the British authorities in the province of New York in 1683, the present Orleans County was part of the territory of Albany County. This was an enormous county, including the northern part of present-day New York State as well as all of the present State of Vermont and, in theory, extending westward to the Pacific Ocean. This county was reduced in size on July 3, 1766, by the creation of Cumberland County, and further on March 16, 1770, by the creation of Gloucester County, both containing territory now in Vermont.

On March 12, 1772, the remaining Albany County was split into three parts, one remaining under the name Albany County. Tryon County contained the large western portion (and thus, since no western boundary was specified, theoretically still extended west to the Pacific). The eastern boundary of Tryon County was approximately five miles west of the present city of Schenectady, and the county included the Mohawk River valley, the western part of the Adirondack Mountains and the area west of the West Branch of the Delaware River. The area then designated as Tryon County now includes 37 counties of New York State. The county was named for William Tryon, colonial governor of New York. This western area was occupied largely by the Onondaga, Oneida and other western nations of the Iroquois Confederacy. The westernmost European settlements were in the area of Little Falls and present-day Herkimer.

During the unrest prior to the outbreak of the American Revolutionary War, feelings ran high in the Mohawk Valley, and there were local attacks by rebels against known Loyalists. Most of Tryon County's Loyalists fled to Canada before 1776, where they were later granted land by the Crown to develop what is now Ontario.

In 1784, following the peace treaty that ended the American Revolutionary War, Tryon County's name was changed to Montgomery County to honor the general, Richard Montgomery. He had captured several places in Canada and died attempting to capture the city of Quebec. It replaced the name of the now hated colonial British governor. In 1789, Ontario County split off from Montgomery. During this period, thousands of migrants settled in the western part of the state from New England and eastern New York resulting in the creation of more counties.

In 1802, Genesee County was created by splitting Ontario County. Genesee County was then divided into Allegany County in 1806, Cattaraugus, Chautauqua, and Niagara Counties in 1808, Ontario, Livingston, and Monroe Counties in 1821, and finally Orleans County in 1824.

When Orleans County was formed in 1824, a dispute arose about naming it after President Andrew Jackson or President John Adams. During and following the Napoleonic era in France, numerous French refugees came to New York, some settling in the upstate areas.

Geography 

The high proportion of water is due to the extension of Orleans County north into Lake Ontario to the Canada–US border (a line of latitude running through the middle of the lake). The distance from the Orleans shore north to the international border is greater than the distance from the shore south to the Genesee County line, meaning the area of Orleans under water is greater than that above water.

Orleans County is in western New York State, northeast of Buffalo and west of Rochester, on the southern shore of Lake Ontario.

The Erie Canal passes (east–west) through the middle of the county. When its construction was completed in 1824, it attracted new settlers to the largely rural county. Trade and passenger traffic stimulated the development of local businesses.

Adjacent counties
 Monroe County - east
 Genesee County - south
 Niagara County - west

Major highways
  New York State Route 18
  New York State Route 31
  New York State Route 63
  New York State Route 98
  New York State Route 104
  Lake Ontario State Parkway

National protected area
 Iroquois National Wildlife Refuge (part)

State protected areas
 Lakeside Beach State Park
 Oak Orchard State Marine Park
 Oak Orchard Wildlife Management Area
 Tonawanda Wildlife Management Area

Government and politics

|}

Starting in 1824, the county government was run by a board of supervisors, consisting of elected supervisors from each township in Orleans County. This geographic representation meant that the residents of more urbanized areas were underrepresented on the board.

In 1980, the state and county established a seven-member elected legislature to replace the board of supervisors. Representatives are elected from single-member districts roughly equal in population. It is headed by a chairman.

Orleans County is heavily Republican. It has voted Republican in every presidential election since the party's founding in 1856, except for one, 1964. It also voted Whig in every election from 1828 until 1852.

County government

Orleans County legislature

Orleans County elected officials

State and federal government 

Orleans County is part of:
 The 8th Judicial District of the New York Supreme Court
 The 4th Division of the New York Supreme Court, Appellate Division

Demographics

As of the census of 2010, there were 42,883 people, 16,119 households, and 10,872 families residing in the county.  The population density was 113 people per square mile (44/km2).  There were 17,347 housing units at an average density of 44 per square mile (17/km2).  The racial makeup of the county was 89.8% White, 5.9% Black or African American, 0.6% Native American, 0.4% Asian, 0.0% Pacific Islander, 1.3% from other races, and 1.9% from two or more races.  4.1% of the population were Hispanic or Latino of any race. According to Census 2000, 20.3% were of German, 18.3% English, 10.8% Italian, 10.3% Irish, 9.4% American and 7.3% Polish ancestry and 96.0% spoke English and 3.0% Spanish as their first language.

Census 2010 showed there were 16,119 households, out of which 31.2% had children under the age of 18 living with them, 49% were married couples living together, 12.4% had a female householder with no husband present, and 32.6% were non-families. 26.2% of all households were made up of individuals, and 11% had someone living alone who was 65 years of age or older.  The average household size was 2.5 and the average family size was 2.99.

In the county, the population was spread out, with 19.8% under the age of 18, 8.8% from 18 to 24, 24.2% from 25 to 44, 29.8% from 45 to 64, and 17.40% who were 65 years of age or older.  The median age was 41 years.

The median income for a household in the county was $48,731. Males had a median income of $32,450 versus $22,605 for females. The per capita income for the county was $16,457.  About 15.2% of the population were below the poverty line.

2020 Census

Education
Public schools

The county has five school districts, although the actual district boundaries can extend into neighboring counties, and the same is true for neighboring counties' districts.  The five districts, from west to east, are:
 Lyndonville Central School District (northern half of western third, roughly covering Lyndonville village and the towns of Yates and Ridgeway)
 Medina Central School District (southern half of western third, roughly covering Medina village and the towns of Ridgeway and Shelby)
 Albion Central School District (middle third, roughly covering Albion village and the towns of Carlton, Gaines, Albion, and Barre)
 Kendall Central School District (northern half of eastern third, roughly covering the towns of Kendall and Murray)
 Holley Central School District (southern half of eastern third, roughly covering Holley village and the towns of Murray and Clarendon)

Each of these school districts participates in Orleans/Niagara BOCES or Monroe #2-Orleans BOCES.

Private school

There is currently one non-denominational K-12 school in the county.
 Orleans County Christian School
College

One college maintains satellite campuses in Orleans County.
 Genesee Community College - Albion
 Genesee Community College - Medina

Recreation 
The County of Orleans has created an interactive map of notable places for visitors to see while visiting the county. 

https://orleanscountytourism.com/history/

Lakes  
There are two major dams on Oak Orchard Creek that have created public boating areas. 

 Waterport Pond in the town of  Carlton also called lake Alice by locals. 
 Glenwood Lake in the town of  Ridgeway and the village of Medina

Libraries 
Orleans County has 4 public libraries serving its population.
 Community Free Library, located in Holley
 Hoag Library, located in Albion
 Lee-Whedon Memorial Library, located in Medina
 Yates Community Library, located in Lyndonville

Museums 
Orleans County has 6 museums that are open to the public.
 Clarendon Historical Society Museum & Farwell’s Settlement
 The Cobblestone Museum
 Holley Depot Museum
Medina Railroad Museum
 Murray-Holley Historical Society
 Oak Orchard Lighthouse Museum

Parks 
There are two State Parks and many municipal parks spread throughout the county.
 Lakeside Beach State Park
 Oak Orchard Marine State Park

Communities

Larger Settlements 
All larger settlements are Villages

Towns

 Albion
 Barre
 Carlton
 Clarendon
 Gaines
 Kendall
 Murray
 Ridgeway
 Shelby
 Yates

Hamlets
 Ashwood
 Barre Center
 Baldwin Corner
 Brockville
  Carlton Station
 Childs
 County Line
 Eagle Harbor
 East Shelby
 Fancher
 Hindsburg
 Hulberton
 Jeddo
  Jones Beach
 Kendall Mills
  Kent
 Kenyonville
 Knowlesville
 Kuckville
  Lomond Shore
 Millers
 Millville
 Oak Orchard
  Point Breeze
 Sawyer
  Shadigee
 Shelby Center
 Sunset Beach
 Yates Center
  Waterport
  West Barre
  West Gaines
  West Shelby

See also

 Orleans County Sheriff's Office
 List of fire departments in Orleans County, New York
 List of counties in New York
 National Register of Historic Places listings in Orleans County, New York
 The Orleans County Libertarian Party

References

Further reading

External links
 Official Webpage
 
 
 Genesee Community College in Orleans County
 Brief historical summary of Orleans County, NY

 
1824 establishments in New York (state)
Populated places established in 1824
Rochester metropolitan area, New York